Sergey Vasilyevich Belyaev (20 September (2 October, new style) 1856, Moscow – ?) was a Major General of the Imperial Russian Army and a brigade commander of the 83th infantry division.

Biography
Sergei Belyaev originated from the Moscow Governorate nobility. In Moscow, he lived in the Frolov family house next to the Saint Nicholas Church on Pillars. He graduated from the Lazarev Institute of Oriental Languages in Moscow and then passed an officer’s examination at the 2nd Constantin Military School in Saint-Petersburg.

He resided at Bolshoy Sampsonievsky Avenue, 65.

Service
He started his military career in 1879. Starting in 1882, he served as praporshchik and podporuchik at the Moscow Guard Regiment. In 1886 he became a poruchik and in 1893, he was promoted to the stabs-kapitan rank for a distinction in service. He subsequently commanded the 11th company at the Moscow Guard Regiment.

In 1897, he was promoted to the captain’s rank. In 1901, Belyaev was awarded an Order of Saint Stanislaus of the 2nd class, and in 1904 he was awarded an Order of Saint Anna of the 2nd class. In 1903, he became a Colonel. In 1909, he received an Order of Saint Vladimir of the 4th class.

World War I

Belyaev fought in the First World War, as the commanding officer of the 71st Belevsky Regiment as a colonel. He was wounded at the front line and from August 18 to 30, 1914, was in the Kiev military hospital. Together with Lieutenant-Colonel Podpolkovnik Ivan D. Datsenko he commanded the 71st Infantry Belevsky Regiment during the victorious attack on the Austrians by the Opatovka River in October 1914, which resulted in the capture of over 900 prisoners

In November 1914 he was appointed commander of the brigade of the 83rd Infantry Division, which fought in eastern Poland. On May 24 1915 he was promoted to Major General from November 9, 1914.

While at the front line, he received several more military insignia. In March 1915 he received swords and a bow to the Order of St. Vladimir of the 4th degree class (for military merit). In April of the same year he received the Order of St. Vladimir 3rd degree class with swords. The last military award was the Order of St. Stanislaus, 1st degree class with swords, which was granted to Belyaev on June 16, 1916.

As of July 10, 1916, he served in the same rank and position, when the 83rd Infantry Division participated in the bloody offensive operation in the region of Baranovichi. He kept records in the field book until July 22, 1917, while the troops were in the village of Kvasovitsa, Volynsk Oblast (now north-western Ukraine). The place and date of his death are unknown.

Awards

 Order of St. Stanislaus 2nd class (1901).
 Order of St. Anna 2nd class (1904).
 Order of St. Vladimir of the 4th class (1909), swords and bows to this order (1915).
 Order of St. Vladimir of the 3rd class with swords (1915).
 Order of St. Stanislaus 1st degree with swords (16.06.1916).

Family
His father Belyaev Vasily Alexeyevich (1823-1881) was a professor at the Lazarev Institute of Oriental Languages. His mother Belyaeva Olga Mikhailovna (1833-1912) was from the Frolov family, who were Moscow merchant jewelers. 

Sergei Belyaev was married to Belyaeva Evgenia Platonovna. His brother Belyaev Nikolai Vasilievich (1859-1920) was an entrepreneur and one of the founders of the Upper Volga Railroad Society. His sister Belyaeva Maria Vasilievna (1869-?) was married to Alexey Belyaev (1859-1906) the Consul general of the Russian Empire in Damascus and Secretary of the Imperial Orthodox Palestine Society.

References

Bibliography 
Belyaev Sergey Vasilievich // List of colonels by rank. Compiled on March 1, 1914 - SPb.: Military printing press of the Empress Catherine the Great, 1914. - P. 25.
Volkov S.V. The Generality of the Russian Empire: The Encyclopedic Dictionary of Generals and Admirals from Peter I to Nicholas II: in 2 volumes. - M.: Tsentrpoligraf, 2009. - T. 1: AK. - P. 523.

1856 births
Date of death unknown
Military personnel from Moscow
People from Moskovsky Uyezd
Nobility from Moscow
Imperial Russian Army generals
Russian military personnel of World War I
Recipients of the Order of St. Vladimir, 1st class
Recipients of the Order of St. Anna, 2nd class
Recipients of the Order of Saint Stanislaus (Russian), 1st class